Roxanne Dufter (born 13 February 1992) is a German speed skater. She competed in the women's 3000 metres at the 2018 Winter Olympics.

References

1992 births
Living people
German female speed skaters
Olympic speed skaters of Germany
Speed skaters at the 2018 Winter Olympics
Place of birth missing (living people)